Ki Kwang-ho (born 1957) is a politician of the Democratic People's Republic of Korea (North Korea). He is a candidate member of the Political Bureau of the Central Committee of the Workers' Party of Korea as well as Minister of Finance in the Cabinet of North Korea. He is the chairman of the Chosun Ice Figure Association.

Biography
After serving as Director of the Ministry of Finance and Economy of the Cabinet, he served as the Vice Minister of Finance from May 2011 to February 2015. In February 2015, Ki Kwang-ho was appointed Minister of Finance. In May 2016, the 7th Congress of the Workers 'Party of Korea was elected as a candidate for the Central Committee of the Workers' Party of Korea. In 2019 he was elected to the 14th convocation of the Supreme People's Assembly.

References

Finance ministers of North Korea
Government ministers of North Korea
Workers' Party of Korea politicians
Members of the Supreme People's Assembly
1957 births
Living people